Waqar Malik (born 15 February 1995) is a Pakistani cricketer. He made his first-class debut for Water and Power Development Authority in the 2018–19 Quaid-e-Azam Trophy on 8 September 2018.

References

External links
 

1995 births
Living people
Pakistani cricketers
Water and Power Development Authority cricketers
Place of birth missing (living people)